XHACD-FM is a radio station on 92.1 FM in Acapulco, Guerrero. It is owned by Grupo Audiorama Comunicaciones and known as Voces with a news/talk format.

History

XEACD-AM 550 received its concession on January 25, 1972. The 500-watt station, initially owned by Ruben Nava del Villar Sánchez, was sold to Radio Mundo de Acapulco, S.A. within five years. The concessionaire name references the Radio Mundo standards format, similar to XEN-AM in Mexico City, that XEACD ran in its early years.

XEACD was cleared for AM-FM migration in 2010 as XHACD-FM 92.1.

In 2017, the station changed from Los 40 to "Retro FM", a Spanish classic hits format, as part of a wider breakup between Audiorama and Televisa Radio.

On November 1, 2019, the station's Retro format ended and it began broadcasting the talk programming of Heraldo Radio. Heraldo programming ended on July 1, 2021, and the station remained in the news/talk format with local programming as "Voces".

References

Radio stations in Guerrero
Radio stations established in 1972
1972 establishments in Mexico